The 2014 European Darts Grand Prix was the seventh of eight PDC European Tour events on the 2014 PDC Pro Tour. The tournament took place at the Glaspalast in Sindelfingen, Germany, between 5–7 September 2014. It featured a field of 48 players and £100,000 in prize money, with £20,000 going to the winner.

Mervyn King won his first European Tour event by beating Michael Smith 6–5 in the final.

Prize money

Qualification and format
The top 16 players from the PDC ProTour Order of Merit on 30 June 2014 automatically qualified for the event. The remaining 32 places went to players from three qualifying events - 20 from the UK Qualifier (held in Coventry on 4 July), eight from the European Qualifier and four from the Host Nation Qualifier (both held at the venue the day before the event started). All seeds receive a bye into the second round.

The following players took part in the tournament:

Top 16
  Gary Anderson (third round)
  Brendan Dolan (second round)
  Robert Thornton (quarter-finals)
  Dave Chisnall (quarter-finals)
  Peter Wright (second round)
  Ian White (second round)
  Kim Huybrechts (third round)
  Steve Beaton (third round)
  Adrian Lewis (quarter-finals)
  Simon Whitlock (semi-finals)
  Mervyn King (winner)
  Vincent van der Voort (third round)
  Justin Pipe (second round)
  Jamie Caven (third round)
  Terry Jenkins (quarter-finals)
  Michael Smith (runner-up)

UK Qualifier 
  Kyle Anderson (second round)
  Chris Aubrey (first round)
  Stephen Bunting (semi-finals)
  Matt Clark (second round)
  Joe Cullen (second round)
  Kevin Dowling (first round)
  Ricky Evans (second round)
  Andrew Gilding (second round)
  Wayne Jones (first round)
  Johnny Haines (first round)
  Andy Hamilton (second round)
  John Henderson (first round)
  Steve Hine (second round)
  James Hubbard (first round)
  Jason Lovett (first round)
  Kevin McDine (second round)
  Shaun Narain (second round)
  Kevin Painter (first round)
  James Wade (third round)
  Darren Webster (third round)

European Qualifier
  Benito van de Pas (first round)
  Rowby-John Rodriguez (third round)
  Ryan de Vreede (second round)
  Robert Marijanović (first round)
  Mensur Suljović (first round)
  Jelle Klaasen (first round)
  Ron Meulenkamp (first round)
  Mike De Decker (first round)

Host Nation Qualifier
  Michael Rosenauer (second round)
  Max Hopp (second round)
  Jyhan Artut (first round)
  Sascha Goldammer (first round)

Draw

References

2014 PDC European Tour
2014 in German sport